Islamic republic is the name given to several states or countries ruled by Islamic laws.

Islamic republic may also refer to:

 Iran, officially the Islamic Republic of Iran
 Pakistan, officially the Islamic Republic of Pakistan
 Islamic Republic of Afghanistan, 2004-2021 government of Afghanistan

 Arab Islamic Republic, a proposed unification of Tunisia and Libya in 1974
 Islamic republic, including several examples

See also
 Islamic state (disambiguation)